The Carrot River is a river in north-eastern Saskatchewan, and north-western Manitoba.  Its headwaters originate in the Cudworth and Tiger Hill Plains near the Town of Wakaw.  The outlet of Wakaw Lake marks the beginning of the Carrot River and, from there, this river flows northeast through the Melfort and Red Earth Plains until it  joins into the Saskatchewan River west of The Pas, Manitoba.  The Carrot River is about 300 km in length and it parallels the course of the South Saskatchewan and Saskatchewan Rivers. 
The Carrot River serves as the main watershed for north-eastern Saskatchewan as all smaller streams and rivers empty into the Carrot River. This causes major flood problems during the spring run off and rainy seasons around the Town of Carrot River and Red Earth Indian Reserve. The floods usually strand everyone east of the river with very few ways around the flooded area.

Another Carrot River enters Oxford Lake on the Hayes River.

History 
The Carrot River valley was initially inhabited by Cree and Saulteaux Aboriginal people. English fur trader and explorer Henry Kelsey explored the river in the summer of 1691.  Louis de la Corne, Chevalier de la Corne and Anthony Henday also explored the valley during the 1750s.

Fossils and historical finds 
During the 1980s the Royal Saskatchewan Museum explored the banks and rock edges of the Carrot River, because a local farmer had been finding numerous fossils in that area.  The tests on the found fossils showed them to be approximately 92 million years old.  The sites along the Carrot River proved to be some of the wealthiest deposits of fossils and showed deposits from numerous other species including sharks and fish.

The most notable find was in 1991, when the Royal Saskatchewan Museum and the Canadian Museum of Nature unearthed the six-metre fossil skeleton of an ancient crocodile, a Terminonaris robustus specimen named "Big Bert". Big Bert turned out to be very well-preserved and the only one of its kind found in Canada. They also found a complete fossil of Xiphactinus and toothed birds.

Fish
The fish species include walleye, yellow perch, northern pike, burbot and white sucker.

See also
List of rivers of Manitoba
List of rivers of Saskatchewan

References

External links 

 Town of Carrot River
 Royal Saskatchewan Museum - Pasquia Hills Project
 Saskatchewan Watershed Advisories and Flood Warnings
 Fish Species of Saskatchewan

Rivers of Saskatchewan
Rivers of Northern Manitoba
Tributaries of Hudson Bay
Saskatchewan River